Lectionary 287, designated by siglum ℓ 287 (in the Gregory-Aland numbering) is a Greek manuscript of the New Testament, on parchment. Palaeographically it has been assigned to the 13th century.
Frederick Henry Ambrose Scrivener labelled it as 166e.

Description 

The codex contains lessons from the Gospel of John, Matthew, and Luke (Evangelistarium), on 201 parchment leaves, with some lacunae.

The text is written in Greek minuscule letters, in two columns per page, 29 lines per page. The manuscript contains weekday Gospel lessons.

It contains the text of the Pericope Adulterae (John 8:3-11).

History 

Scrivener and Gregory dated the manuscript to the 13th century. It has been assigned by the Institute for New Testament Textual Research to the 13th century.

The manuscript was added to the list of New Testament manuscripts by Scrivener (number 166e) and Gregory (number 287e). Gregory saw the manuscript in 1886.

The manuscript is not cited in the critical editions of the Greek New Testament (UBS3).

The codex is housed at the Biblioteca Ambrosiana (D. 108 sup., fol. 3–203) in Milan. The leaves 1–2,204 of the same codex are classified as lectionary 2352 (Gregory-Aland).

See also 

 List of New Testament lectionaries
 Biblical manuscript
 Textual criticism
 Lectionary 286

Notes and references

Bibliography 

 

Greek New Testament lectionaries
13th-century biblical manuscripts
Manuscripts of the Ambrosiana collections